Bahujan Shakti Party is a political party in Nepal led by Vishwendra Paswan.

History 
In the 2008 Constituent Assembly election, the party won 1 seat through the Proportional Representation vote.

The party was continuent of the NC-UML alliance. As of 2013, its independent in Constituent Assembly.

Bahujan Shakti Party won 1 seat in 2013 Nepalese Constituent Assembly election.

Ideology 
The Bahujan Shakti Party rejected in September the proposed 2015 Constitution stating that it did not provide rights to 85% of communities (that are marginalised by 15% Highest caste Hindus) in Nepal (Bahujan Samaj of Nepal). For ensuring rights to 85% Bahujan Samaj of Nepal in new Constitution of Nepal, Biswendra Paswan sat on Hunger strike. The demands in agendas of his agitation are:
Guaranteed 14 percent representation of dalits in every state apparatus 
15 per cent representation of the backward community of Nepal
10 per cent of Muslims of Nepal 
37 per cent of the representation indigenous nationalities 
Capital punishment against those convicted guilty in the cases of corruption and rape.

See also 
Bahujan Samaj

References

Political parties in Nepal
Political parties with year of establishment missing
Ambedkarite political parties